Gilbert Ulang (born July 23, 1979) is a Filipino former darts player.

Career
Ulang represented the Philippines alongside Lourence Ilagan at the 2015 PDC World Cup of Darts, during which they lost in the first round to Belgium's Kim & Ronny Huybrechts. Ulang also competed at the 2016 World Cup with Alex Tagarao as the Philippines reached the second round, where they were eliminated by Michael van Gerwen and Raymond van Barneveld of the Netherlands.

Ulang qualified for the 2017 PDC World Darts Championship after defeating Prussian Dela Crus in the Final of the Philippines Qualifier. He was defeated 2–0 in the preliminary round by fellow debutant Kevin Simm.

Following an investigation into his match with Simm, Ulang was suspended by the Darts Regulation Authority until 17 December 2023 for match fixing.

References

External links

1979 births
Living people
Filipino darts players
People from Pasig
Match fixers
PDC World Cup of Darts Filipino team